The Northwest 8 Conference was a high school conference in northwest and north central Illinois. The conference participated in athletics and activities in the Illinois High School Association. The conference included small public high schools with enrollments between 75-600 students in Boone, Carroll, DeKalb, Jo Daviess, Lee, Ogle, Stephenson, and Winnebago counties.

History
This conference was composed of teams from the short-lived original Upstate Illini Conference (1974 to 1976), the first year of competition was 1977 with eight charter schools: Ashton, Durand, Franklin Center, Leaf River, Milledgeville, Mt. Carroll, Pearl City and Rockford Lutheran. The primary reason for the creation of the league was football based, all of the teams from the Upstate Illini with football, except for Orangeville High School, merged into a conference of like sized schools. Prior to the 1982 season Rockford Lutheran left the conference, moving to the Prairie Conference. In 1985, a significant change in structure occurred as Kirkland-Hiawatha left the Trailblazer Conference and joined the Northwest 8, Ashton and Franklin Center began their coop and Leaf River dropped football, leaving the league with 6 teams for football. In 1987, the conference began talks with the Upstate Illini to create a league that would be divided into divisions with equal numbers for all sports, including football. In 1988, North Boone, South Beloit, Warren and River Ridge joined the conference while Rockford Lutheran rejoined.  Even though the league was re-branded in 1988, the official final year of competition was 1990 in order to realign football schedules. 

Based on the fact that there were originally 8 teams, the conference maintained the name Northwest 8 even when the total number of schools dropped below or increased beyond that total. The league eventually rose to 12 teams and due to the increased number, talks for a re-branding of the Northwest 8 took place in 1987. In 1988, the idea of moving back to the Upstate Illini provided an opportunity to eliminate a conference name that included a number, and competition for all sports, with the exception of football, was established. In 1991, football schedules were set with 6 teams in the North Division: Durand, North Boone, Pearl City, Rockford (Lutheran), Elizabeth (River Ridge)-Warren (coop) and South Beloit and the South Division: Ashton-Franklin Center, Kirkland-Hiawatha, Milledgeville, Mt. Carroll, Mt. Morris and Polo.

Member schools

* Ashton and Franklin Center began a sports CoOp in 1985, creating a new mascot and school colors.
Sources:IHSA Conferences, IHSA Coop Teams, and IHSA Member Schools Directory

Membership timeline 

     

 River Ridge became a consolidated school district in 1986, combining Elizabeth High School and Hanover High School, both coming from the Upstate Illini Conference

References

External links
 Ashton-Franklin Center High School
 Durand High School
 Kirkland-Hiawatha High School
 Milledgeville High School
 North Boone High School
 Pearl City High School
 Polo High School
 River Ridge High School
 Rockford Lutheran High School
 South Beloit High School
 Warren High School
 West Carroll High School

High school sports in Illinois
Illinois high school sports conferences